Biba was an award winning restaurant in Boston owned by Lydia Shire.  It “opened to great fanfare” in 1989.  The restaurant, overlooking the Public Garden, was designed by Adam Tihany.

The menu was described as “Shire's own particular eclectic blend of traditional American regional cuisine and New England seafood, with accents of Italy, California and Asia.”  Instead of being arranged in traditional categories such as appetizers and entrees, it was divided by meat, starch, "legumina" (vegetables), offal (two different preparations of calves brains; lamb tongue with fava beans) and fish.

In 1998, chef Susan Regis won the James Beard Foundation Award for Best Chef in the Northeast.  In 1992, Shire won the same award for her work at the restaurant.

Their Bar was renowned as well, in part for their cigar nights. Shire commissioned Robert Jessup to create a mural that spans the wall above it. She insisted it include a can of anchovies, a man smoking a cigar and a woman's naked breast.

Biba closed on September 11, 2001.

Notable alumni
Joanne Chang

References

1989 establishments in Massachusetts
Defunct restaurants in Boston